Thazhuthala  is a peaceful and serene village located two kilometres north of Kottiyam junction in  Kollam district in the state of Kerala, India. The village is known by the Sree Maha Ganapathi temple and the famous 'Gajothsavam' equivalent to the Thrissur Pooram.

References

External links
www.thazhuthalavinayaka.com

Villages in Kollam district